The Haixia Olympic Centre is a sports complex with a multi-purpose stadium named Haixia Olympic Centre Stadium in Fuzhou, China. Opened in 2015, the stadium is designed for a capacity of 59,562 spectators.

The complex comprises an indoor arena with a capacity of 12,980 spectators, an aquatics center with a capacity of 3,978 spectators and a tennis stadium with a capacity of 3,152 spectators. Additionally, a municipal sports school will also be built within the complex grounds featuring training halls for indoor sports, swimming pools, a shooting range, an archery field and a beach volleyball stadium.

External links
Stadium Information
Project Information
Award of 8th National City Games

Football venues in China
Buildings and structures in Fuzhou
Sports venues in Fujian
Badminton venues
Sport in Fuzhou